Phalaris (16 May 1913 – 28 February 1931) was a British bred Thoroughbred racehorse, later a Leading sire in Great Britain and Ireland and a Leading broodmare sire in Great Britain & Ireland. He appears in the sireline (stallion to stallion) of all racehorses which were winners of more than $10 million, as well as all yearlings that were auctioned for more than $7.5 million.

Background
Phalaris was sired by the Champion Stakes winner Polymelus out of Bromus by the Epsom Derby winner Sainfoin, she being closely inbred in the second and third removes to Springfield. Bromus also foaled Hainault by Swynford.  Phalaris was from a long line of successful sires. The conformation of Phalaris was typical of a sprinter, upstanding in build, but he was slightly back at the knee.

Racing career
At the age of two years he was rated 9 lbs (4 kg) below the champion filly Fifinella. At three years he was not up to the classic standard at a mile but he did win over 10 furlongs (2,000 metres). At four and five years old he was a very good sprinter, able to carry more than 10 stone (63.5 kilograms) and win on three occasions. Phalaris only raced at Newmarket where he won 16 of his 24 starts and was placed on another three occasions. He was the winner of the Stud Produce Stakes; Redmere Nursery Stakes; Beaufort Stakes; St. George Stakes; Royal Stakes; Bretby Handicap; Chesterfield Stakes; St. Ives Handicap; Bury St. Edmunds Plate; Snailwell Stakes; Challenge Stakes (twice); The Whip; Abingdon Plate; June Stakes and Lanwades Plate. Phalaris was the top sprinter in 1917 and 1918 when racing was restricted due to World War I. Phalaris was kept in training for four seasons, and was retired to Lord Derby's stud.

Stud record
Phalaris was one of the most influential sires to serve Lord Derby's interests, and he had a major influence on modern Thoroughbred pedigrees the world over. He is today the most influential patriarch of the Bend Or dynasty and arguably the world's most influential sire of the 20th century. Nearly all runners in the main races of the leading racing nations are now from the Phalaris sire-line. He appears in the tail-male line (those coming straight through father to son to grandson etc.) of all nine horses that have earned more than $10 million.

He was the Leading sire in Great Britain and Ireland in 1925, 1928, once second and third and was the Leading broodmare sire in Great Britain & Ireland in 1937, 1941 and 1942.

Among his notable progeny, Phalaris sired five Classic race winners plus the following horses:

Phalaris’ major tail-male descendants in the USA include, Native Dancer, Raise a Native, Mr. Prospector, Bold Ruler, Secretariat, Affirmed, Alydar, Seattle Slew, and of course the great Northern Dancer. among many others.  His tail-male line British descendants, or those that raced in Britain or Ireland, include such champions as Arkle (steeplechaser), Blue Peter, Fair Trial, Nasrullah, Royal Palace, Nijinsky, Sir Ivor, Roberto, Brigadier Gerard, Mill Reef, Shergar, Troy, Grundy, Galileo, Sea Bird II, Sea the Stars, High Chaparral and Frankel

Phalaris dropped dead after covering a mare on 28 February 1931 at the age of 16 years.

Pedigree

See also
 List of leading Thoroughbred racehorses

References

 Designing Speed in the Racehorse by Ken McLean (2005)

External links
 Observations on Thoroughbred Evolution

1913 racehorse births
1931 racehorse deaths
British Champion Thoroughbred Sires
Racehorses bred in the United Kingdom
Racehorses trained in the United Kingdom
Thoroughbred family 1-i
Chefs-de-Race